Tonica nigricostella is a moth in the family Depressariidae. It was described by Snellen in 1901. It is found on Sumatra and Java.

The wingspan is 38-45 mm.

References

Moths described in 1901
Tonica